The Woman Game is a 1920 silent film society drama directed by William P. S. Earle and starring Elaine Hammerstein and Jere Austin. It was produced and released by Selznick Pictures Corporation. It is a surviving silent held in the Library of Congress collection.

Cast
Elaine Hammerstein - Amy Terrell
Jere Austin - Andrew Masters
Louis Broughton - Capt. Davenport
Florence Billings - Mrs. Van Trant
Charles Eldridge - Jacky Van Trant
Ida Darling - Mrs. Smythe-Smythe
Blanche Davenport - Mr. Terrell
James W. Morrison - Leonard Travers
Charles Duncan -

Preservation status
Print held by The Library of Congress.

References

External links

1920 films
American silent feature films
American black-and-white films
Films directed by William P. S. Earle
Silent American drama films
1920 drama films
1920s English-language films
1920s American films